Alessia Mancini (born 25 June 1978, in Marino) is an Italian television host, television personality, actress and showgirl.

Biography
Alessia Mancini made her television debut in 1994, she took part in Non è la RAI on Italia 1. After this experience, she took part to the Canale 5 show Striscia la notizia, where she acted as "velina"; she took part also to the Canale 5 show Doppio lustro.

In 1997 she was in the music video Born to Be Abramo of Elio e le Storie Tese. In 1998 she took part in Simpaticissima on Rete 4, and the next year in La Ruota Della Fortunaon Rete 4 and Scherzi a parte on Canale 5.

From 1999 to 2002 she was a co-protagonist in Passaparola, italian version of The Alphabet Game, quiz hosted by Gerry Scotti. In 2000 Alessia Mancini co-hosted, with Gerry Scotti, Un disco per l'estate on Canale 5; the next year sho co-hosted Facce da quiz on Canale 5. In 2000 and in 2002 she took part in La sai l'ultima? on Canale 5.

Alessia Mancini made her music debut in 2001 with Angel Bahia. In 2002 Alessia Mancini hosted Bande sonore on Italia 1. In 2002 she played a role (Ada) in Gian Burrasca directed by Maurizio Pagnussat. From 2002 to 2003 she was in the cast of Mezzogiorno in famiglia, television show on Rai 2. In 2003 she played a role (Giulia Ferri) in Tutti i sogni del mondo, television series directed by Paolo Poeti.

In 2004 she took part in La sai l'ultima? VIP on Canale 5 and il gioco dei 9, italian version of Hollywood Squares, on Italia 1. The next year she was a contestant of La talpa 2, reality show on Italia 1.

From 2006 to 2007 she was a co-protagonist in Stranamore television program on Rete 4 In 2007 Alessia Mancini co-hosted Telethon on Rai 2 and she played a role (Anna) in the film Natale in crociera directed by Neri Parenti. The next year she played a role (Martha Arcuati) in television series Don Matteo (episode 6x04 La stanza di un angelo).

From 2009 to 2010 she hosted Tendenza casa on Leonardo. In 2013 she hosted a reportage on Sì Sposaitalia - Reality in passerella on La sposa TV.

From 206 to 2018 she took part in Caduta libera, italian version of Who's Still Standing? on Canale 5. In 2018 she was semifinalist of L'isola dei famosi 13, reality show on Canale 5. In this year she took part in Avanti un altro! pure di sera on Canale 5.

In 2019 Alessia Mancini she took part in Guess My Age - Indovina l'età on TV8 and she hosted In salotto on TV8.

Personal life
Alessia Mancini and Flavio Montrucchio married on 11 October 2003 in Rome. The couple has two children.

Television
Non è la RAI (Italia 1, 1994-1995)
Striscia la notizia (Canale 5, 1997-1998)
Doppio lustro (Canale 5, 1998)
Simpaticissima (Rete 4, 1998)
La Ruota Della Fortuna (Rete 4, 1999)
Scherzi a parte (Canale 5, 1999)
Passaparola (Canale 5, 1999-2002)
Un disco per l'estate (Canale 5, 2000)
La sai l'ultima? (Canale 5, 2000-2002) 
Facce da quiz (Canale 5, 2001) 
Bande sonore (Italia 1, 2002)
Mezzogiorno in famiglia (Rai 2, 2002-2003)
La sai l'ultima? VIP (Canale 5, 2004)
Il gioco dei 9 (Italia 1, 2004)
La talpa 2 (Italia 1, 2005)
Stranamore (Rete 4, 2006-2007)
Telethon (Rai 2, 2007)
Tendenze casa (Leonardo, 2009-2010)
Sì Sposaitalia - Reality in passerella (La sposa TV, 2013)
Caduta libera (Canale 5, 2016-2018)
L'isola dei famosi 13 (Canale 5, 2018)
Avanti un altro! pure di sera (Canale 5, 2018)
Guess My Age - Indovina l'età (TV8, 2019)
In salotto (TV8, 2019)

Filmography

Cinema 
Natale in crociera, directed by Neri Parenti (2007)

Television
Gian Burrasca, directed by Maurizio Pagnussat (2002)
Tutti i sogni del mondo,  directed by Paolo Poeti (2003)
Don Matteo, episode 6x04 (2008)

Music videos 
Born to Be Abramo by Elio e le Storie Tese (1997)

Discography
 2001 - Angel Bahia

Advertising campaigns 
 Bon Bons of Malizia
 Boccadamo Gioielli
 Fairy Active Caps
 Acqua Sant'Anna
 Widiba
 Chateau d'Ax
 Auricchio
 Acqua & Sapone
 Rigoni di Asiago
 Balocco
 Optima
 Permaflex
 Guam
 Postepay 2019
 And others for Mediaset

References

External links

 

1978 births
Living people
Italian film actresses
20th-century Italian actresses
21st-century Italian actresses
Italian showgirls
21st-century Italian singers
21st-century Italian women singers
People from Marino, Lazio